Nazim Siddiqui (born 17 October 1994) is an Indian cricketer. He made his first-class debut for Jharkhand in the 2017–18 Ranji Trophy on 6 October 2017. He made his List A debut for Jharkhand in the 2017–18 Vijay Hazare Trophy on 5 February 2018.

References

External links
 

1994 births
Living people
Indian cricketers
Place of birth missing (living people)
Jharkhand cricketers